The 2006 New Hampshire Wildcats football team represented the University of New Hampshire in the 2006 NCAA Division I FCS football season. The Wildcats were led by eight-year head coach Sean McDonnell and played their home games at Cowell Stadium in Durham, New Hampshire. They were a member of the Atlantic 10 Conference (A-10) and moved to the Colonial Athletic Association (CAA) following the conclusion of the season. They finished the season 9–4 overalla nd 5–3 in A–10 play. They received an at-large bid into the FCS playoffs where they lost in the quarterfinals to UMass.

Schedule

References

New Hampshire
New Hampshire Wildcats football seasons
New Hampshire Wildcats football